Chinchwad railway station is an important halt on the Pune Suburban Railway. It connects to the historic centre of Pune and is one of the oldest local railway station. It is located 2.1 km from Chinchwad Bus Terminal,  is 18 km away. Few trains travelling from Mumbai to Pune or Kolhapur have their halt on this station. The nearest airport is Pune International Airport which is 15 km away. This is operated by Central Railway division of Indian Railways. This station has four platforms and one footbridge.

Express & Passenger 

Trains halting at Chinchwad railway station are:-

 Mumbai–Kolhapur Koyna Express
 Panvel–Hazur Sahib Nanded Express
 Pune–Mumbai Sinhagad Express
 Pune–Panvel Passenger
 Mumbai–Bijapur Passenger
 Mumbai–Shirdi Passenger
 Mumbai–Pandharpur Passenger
 Pune–Bhusaval Express
 Indore–Pune Superfast Express
 Indore–Pune Express (via Panvel)
 Pune–Valsad Express
 Pune–Ernakulam (Holiday Special) Humsafar Express
 Pune–Gwalior Weekly Express

Suburban trains

Local or Suburban trains travelling on the Pune Junction–Lonavala–Pune Junction or Pune Junction–Talegaon–Pune Junction routes halt at this station.

Lonavala / Talegaon Locals

Pune Locals

References

Chinchwad Railway Station

Railway stations in Pune district
Transport in Pimpri-Chinchwad
Pune Suburban Railway
Pune railway division
Buildings and structures in Pimpri-Chinchwad